Lady Selina Shirley Hastings (born 5 March 1945) is a British journalist, author and biographer.

Biography 
The elder daughter of Francis, 16th Earl of Huntingdon, by his second marriage to Margaret Lane. Hastings was educated at St Hugh's College, Oxford, where she took an MA degree.

Hastings' books include Sir Gawain and the Loathly Lady (1985), Nancy Mitford (1986), The Singing Ringing Tree (1988), The Man Who Wanted to Live Forever (1988), The Firebird (1995), Evelyn Waugh (1995), Beibl Lliw Y Plant (1998), Rosamond Lehmann (2002) and The Secret Lives of Somerset Maugham (2010). She is a past recipient of the Marsh Biography Award.

Reviewing Nancy Mitford for The New York Times, William McBrien questioned Hastings' sparse documentation of some of the facts in the book. He praised the book for its depiction of that historical period. Evelyn Waugh was reviewed by The New York Times, The Guardian and The Spectator. Rosamond Lehmann was reviewed in The Guardian and The Daily Telegraph. The Secret Lives of Somerset Maugham was reviewed in The New York Times, The Guardian, The Washington Post and the Los Angeles Times.

Hastings was elected a Fellow of the Royal Society of Literature (FRSL) in 1994. Among others she and her sister, Lady Harriet Shackleton, are in remainder to several ancient English baronies, including those of Hastings and Botreaux.

See also 
 Earl of Huntingdon

References

1945 births
Living people
Fellows of the Royal Society of Literature
Alumni of St Hugh's College, Oxford
English biographers
English literary historians
English non-fiction writers
English people of Scottish descent
Selina
Daughters of British earls
British women historians
Women literary historians
Women biographers